Life 'n Perspectives of a Genuine Crossover is the second album by Dutch hip hop band Urban Dance Squad. The album showcases an even more diverse mix of music genres than their debut album, genres including hard rock, hip-hop, funk, blues, ska, Caribbean music and an Indian flavour on "Bureaucrat of Flaccostreet". AllMusic calls the album "aimless", particularly in comparison with their first album. Critic Steven Blush, who interviewed the band in New York just prior to the album's release, called it "stellar".

The album, unhelped by a single (to the dismay of label boss Clive Davis), did not sell particularly well and the band was unhappy with the label's marketing efforts. The UDS left Arista and signed with Virgin Records. A version of the album from 1999 released by Triple X Records includes a second CD, containing a UDS show in Tokyo, 1992.

Track listing

 "Comeback" – 4:27
 "(Thru) the Gates of the Big Fruit" – 4:15
 "Life 'N Perspectives I" – 1:02
 "Mr. EZway" – 3:40
 "Thru the Eyes of Jason" – 3:30
 "Routine" – 5:01
 "Life 'N Perspectives II" – 1:14
 "Son of the Culture Clash" – 3:28
 "Careless" – 4:00
 "Grand Black Citizen" – 3:50
 "Life 'N Perspectives III" – 0:56
 "Harvey Quinnt" – 3:32
 "Duck Ska" – 3:07
 "Life 'N Perspectives IV" – 1:22
 "For the Plasters" – 4:27
 "Wino the Medicineman" – 3:26
 "Bureaucrat of Flaccostreet" – 4:57

References

External links

1991 albums
Urban Dance Squad albums
Arista Records albums